Wet Sleddale Reservoir is an artificial reservoir set amongst the Shap Fells  south of the village of Shap in Cumbria, England, and lies just within the boundary of the Lake District National Park. The triangular shaped reservoir, which can store 2,300 million litres of water, was created by the construction of a dam across Sleddale Beck in order to supply Manchester with water. The dam is 21m high and 600m long.

The extracted water is carried to Haweswater, mainly through tunnels.

The beck emerges from the foot of the dam as the River Lowther. There is a public car park beneath the dam from which a public right of way gives access to the south side of the reservoir. Alfred Wainwright describes a walk from here in the Wet Sleddale Horseshoe chapter of his The Outlying Fells of Lakeland.

Manchester Corporation were given powers to construct the reservoir under the Haweswater Act, 1919 but construction did not start until the 1960s and completion was in 1966.

References 

Reservoirs in Cumbria
Lakes of the Lake District
Eden District